Mukesh Tiwari (born 24 August 1969) is an Indian actor, who has worked predominantly in Bollywood. and few Tamil, Punjabi, Kannada and Telugu films. He is known for playing negative and comic side roles. He entered the film industry in the year 1998 with the movie China Gate. He is known for his work in The Legend of Bhagat Singh, Gangaajal  and Golmaal.

Early life 

Tiwari studied at the National School of Drama and was termed as the best actor present in the university at the time by numerous professors.

Filmography

References

External links
 

Male actors in Hindi cinema
Male actors in Bhojpuri cinema
Male actors in Kannada cinema
Male actors in Punjabi cinema
Male actors in Tamil cinema
Male actors in Telugu cinema
Indian male film actors
Living people
Male actors from Madhya Pradesh
21st-century Indian male actors
People from Sagar, Madhya Pradesh
National School of Drama alumni
1968 births
Zee Cine Awards winners